Caio Magalhães (born December 14, 1987) is a Brazilian professional mixed martial artist who most recently competed in the Middleweight division of the Professional Fighters League. A professional competitor since 2009, he has also competed for the UFC and M-1 Global.

Mixed martial arts career

Ultimate Fighting Championship
Magalhães made his UFC debut on June 8, 2012 at UFC on FX 3 against fellow newcomer Buddy Roberts. He was outstruck throughout the fight by the much faster Roberts and was having significant difficulties trying to take Roberts down as he was fatigued.

Magalhães fought Karlos Vemola on June 8, 2013 at UFC on Fuel TV 10. Despite losing the first round badly, he rallied back to win the fight via rear-naked choke submission in the second round.

Magalhães next faced Nick Ring on December 7, 2013 at UFC Fight Night 33. He won the back-and-forth fight via unanimous decision.

Magalhães was expected to face Josh Samman on April 19, 2014 at UFC on Fox 11.  However, on April 8, Samman pulled out of the bout with a hamstring injury.  Magalhães instead fought Luke Zachrich. He was victorious via first-round TKO.

Magalhães faced Trevor Smith on November 8, 2014 at UFC Fight Night 56. Magalhães won the fight quickly by knockout in the first round.  The stoppage was not without a bit of controversy.  Magalhães stunned Smith with a knee and forced a referee stoppage with multiple follow up punches.  It appeared that during the final flurry, several hammerfists landed on the back of Smith's head as he lay unconscious on the canvas. Following the match, Magalhães stated "I didn’t notice that," in reference to the strikes to the back of Smith's head. "His coach talked to me after the fight, said I punched the back of his head, but I didn’t notice it. The referee should have stepped in if he saw something, but he was already out from the punch and knee I landed."
Magalhães was very briefly scheduled to face Mark Muñoz on February 28, 2015 at UFC 184.  However, shortly after the bout was announced by the UFC, Magalhães indicated that he would not be able to compete at the event due to a lingering infection after recent dental surgery, which would require additional surgery.  Muñoz eventually stayed on the card against returning veteran Roan Carneiro.

Magalhães next faced Josh Samman on July 12, 2015 at The Ultimate Fighter 21 Finale. He lost the fight via submission in the first round. The NSAC issued a temporary suspension after the fight because he spat in the face of Samman after being submitted, and also in the face of referee John McCarthy.

Magalhães was expected to face Cezar Ferreira on April 16, 2016 at UFC on Fox 19. However, Magalhães pulled out of the fight in the week leading up to the event citing an ankle injury and was replaced by Oluwale Bamgbose.

Magalhães next faced Brad Tavares on September 10, 2016 at UFC 203. He lost the fight via split decision and was subsequently released from the promotion.

Personal life
Magalhaes currently trains and instructs at Teixeira MMA & Fitness.

Mixed martial arts record

|-
|Loss
|align=center|10–7
|Eric Spicely
|TKO (punches)
|CES 55
|
|align=center|1
|align=center|4:00
|Hartford, Connecticut, United States
|
|-
|Loss
|align=center|10–6
|Sadibou Sy
|KO (head kick and punches)
|PFL 7
|
|align=center|1
|align=center|2:06
|Atlantic City, New Jersey, United States
|
|-
|Loss
|align=center|10–5
|Mikhail Zayats
|Decision (unanimous)
|M-1 Challenge 91
|
|align=center|3
|align=center|5:00
|Shenzhen, China
|
|-
|Loss
|align=center|10–4
|Artem Frolov	
|Decision (unanimous)
|M-1 Challenge 84
|
|align=center|5
|align=center|5:00
|St. Petersburg, Russia
|
|-
|Win
|align=center|10–3
|Dmitry Voitov
|Submission (rear-naked choke)
|M-1 Challenge 78
|
|align=center|1
|align=center|1:16
|Orenburg, Russia
|
|-
|Loss
|align=center|9–3
|Brad Tavares
|Decision (split)
|UFC 203
|
|align=center|3
|align=center|5:00
|Cleveland, Ohio, United States
|
|-
|Loss
|align=center|9–2
|Josh Samman
|Submission (rear-naked choke)
|The Ultimate Fighter: American Top Team vs. Blackzilians Finale
|
|align=center|1
|align=center|2:52
|Las Vegas, Nevada, United States
|
|-
|Win
|align=center|9–1
|Trevor Smith
|KO (knee and punches)
|UFC Fight Night: Shogun vs. Saint Preux
|
|align=center|1
|align=center|0:31
|Uberlândia, Brazil
|
|-
|Win
|align=center|8–1
|Luke Zachrich
|TKO (punches)
|UFC on Fox: Werdum vs. Browne
|
|align=center|1
|align=center|0:44
|Orlando, Florida, United States
|
|-
|Win
|align=center|7–1
|Nick Ring
|Decision (unanimous)
|UFC Fight Night: Hunt vs. Bigfoot
|
|align=center|3
|align=center|5:00
|Brisbane, Australia
|
|-
|Win
|align=center|6–1
|Karlos Vémola
|Submission (rear-naked choke)
|UFC on Fuel TV: Nogueira vs. Werdum
|
|align=center|2
|align=center|2:49
|Fortaleza, Brazil
|
|-
|Loss
|align=center|5–1
|Buddy Roberts
|Decision (unanimous)
|UFC on FX: Johnson vs. McCall
|
|align=center|3
|align=center|5:00
|Sunrise, Florida, United States
|
|-
|Win
|align=center|5–0
|Ismael de Jesus
|Decision (split)
|Shooto: Brazil 27
|
|align=center|3
|align=center|5:00
|Brasília, Brazil
|
|-
|Win
|align=center|4–0
|Messias Pai de Santo
|Submission (rear-naked choke)
|AF: Amazon Fight 7
|
|align=center|1
|align=center|3:05
|Belém, Brazil
|
|-
|Win
|align=center|3–0
|Otavio Lacerda
|TKO (punches)
|AF: Amazon Fight 5
|
|align=center|1
|align=center|4:58
|Belém, Brazil
|
|-
|Win
|align=center|2–0
|Paulo Henrique Garcia 
|Decision (split)
|IMC: Iron Man Championship 5
|
|align=center|3
|align=center|5:00
|Belém, Brazil
|
|-
|Win
|align=center|1–0
|Maurilio de Souza
|Submission (omoplata)
|Shooto: Brazil 13
|
|align=center|3
|align=center|3:25
|Fortaleza, Brazil
|

See also
 List of current UFC fighters
 List of male mixed martial artists

External links

Official UFC Profile

Teixeira MMA & Fitness

References

1987 births
Brazilian male mixed martial artists
Middleweight mixed martial artists
Living people
Brazilian practitioners of Brazilian jiu-jitsu
Light heavyweight mixed martial artists
Mixed martial artists utilizing Brazilian jiu-jitsu
People awarded a black belt in Brazilian jiu-jitsu
Ultimate Fighting Championship male fighters
People from Sobral, Ceará
Sportspeople from Ceará